Samuel Benjamin Bankman-Fried (born March 6, 1992), also known by the initialism SBF, is an American entrepreneur, investor, and former billionaire. Bankman-Fried was the founder and CEO of the cryptocurrency exchange FTX and associated trading firm Alameda Research, both of which experienced a high-profile collapse resulting in chapter 11 bankruptcy in late 2022.

Prior to FTX's collapse, Bankman-Fried was ranked the 41st richest American in the Forbes 400, and the 60th richest person in world by The World's Billionaires. His net worth peaked at $26 billion. By November 11, 2022, amid the bankruptcy of FTX, the Bloomberg Billionaires Index considered his net worth to have been reduced to zero. Before his wealth evaporated, Bankman-Fried was a major donor to political campaigns, donating mostly to Democratic candidates (while unverifiably claiming to have channeled "dark money" to Republican candidates) and claimed that he planned to spend perhaps $1 billion in the 2024 U.S. presidential election.

On December 12, 2022, Bankman-Fried was arrested in the Bahamas and was subsequently extradited to the United States. An indictment of him before the U.S. District Court for the Southern District of New York was unsealed on December 13, revealing eight criminal charges for offenses including wire fraud, commodities fraud, securities fraud, money laundering, and campaign finance law violations; Bankman-Fried faces up to 115 years in prison if convicted on all eight counts. An additional 4 charges were announced in February 2023. On December 22, Bankman-Fried was released on a $250 million bond, on condition that he reside at his parents' home in California.

Early life and education 
Bankman-Fried was born on March 6, 1992, on the campus of Stanford University, into a Jewish family. He is the son of Barbara Fried and Joseph Bankman, both professors at Stanford Law School. His aunt Linda P. Fried is the dean of Columbia University Mailman School of Public Health. His brother, Gabriel Bankman-Fried, is a former Wall Street trader and the former director of the non-profit Guarding Against Pandemics and its associated political action committee.

Bankman-Fried attended Canada/USA Mathcamp, a summer program for mathematically talented high-school students. He attended high school at Crystal Springs Uplands School in Hillsborough, California. He graduated from the Massachusetts Institute of Technology in 2014 with a bachelor's degree in physics and a minor in mathematics. As an MIT student he lived in a coeducational group house called Epsilon Theta.

Career 

In the summer of 2013, Bankman-Fried worked as an intern at Jane Street Capital, a proprietary trading firm, trading international ETFs. He returned to work there full-time after graduation from MIT.

In September 2017, Bankman-Fried left Jane Street and moved to Berkeley, where he worked briefly at the Centre for Effective Altruism as director of development from October to November 2017. In November 2017, he co-founded Alameda Research, a quantitative trading firm, with Tara Mac Aulay from the Centre for Effective Altruism. As of 2021, Bankman-Fried owned approximately 90 percent of Alameda Research. In January 2018, Bankman-Fried organized an arbitrage trade, moving up to $25 million per day, to take advantage of the higher price of bitcoin in Japan compared to the United States. After attending a late 2018 cryptocurrency conference in Macau, he moved to Hong Kong.

Bankman-Fried founded FTX, a cryptocurrency derivatives exchange, in April 2019; it opened for business the following month. On December 8, 2021, Bankman-Fried, along with other industry executives, testified before the Committee on Financial Services about regulating the cryptocurrency industry. On May 12, 2022, it was disclosed that Emergent Fidelity Technologies Ltd., which is majority owned by Bankman-Fried, had bought 7.6 percent of Robinhood Markets stock. In a November 2022 affidavit before the Eastern Caribbean Supreme Court, and prior to his arrest, Bankman-Fried said he and FTX co-founder Gary Wang together borrowed over $546 million from Alameda Research in order to finance Emergent Fidelity Technologies' purchase of Robinhood Markets stock.

In September 2022, it was reported that Bankman-Fried's advisors had offered on his behalf to help fund Elon Musk's purchase of Twitter. According to messages released as part of the lawsuit between Twitter and Musk during the latter's acquisition of Twitter, on April 25, 2022, investment banker Michael Grimes wrote that Bankman-Fried would be willing to commit up to $5 billion. No investment actually took place when Musk finalized the acquisition. Bankman-Fried invested more than $500 million in venture capital firms, including $200 million in Sequoia Capital, itself an investor in FTX Sequoia published a "glowing" profile of Bankman-Fried which it subsequently removed after the solvency crisis at FTX.

Views on charity and market regulation 
Bankman-Fried has publicly stated he supports effective altruism, contending that he was pursuing "earning to give" as an "altruistic career." He is a member of Giving What We Can and has claimed he plans to make donations "not based on personal interest but on the projects that are proven by data to be the most effective at helping people."

Bankman-Fried is the founder of the FTX Future Fund, whose team included Scottish philosopher and author William MacAskill, one of the founders of the effective altruism movement. After the collapse of FTX, all members of Future Fund simultaneously resigned. As of September 1, 2022, the Future Fund stated it "only committed around $160 million" in grants and investments.

In November 2022, Bankman-Fried stated in a text conversation with Vox writer Kelsey Piper that the appearance that he and his company displayed of welcoming regulation and promoting the need for regulators to keep a close eye on cryptocurrency markets was not sincere, and was "just PR", adding that "they [regulators] make everything worse". On being asked about his previously stated ethical views that it's unacceptable to do unethical things for the greater good, he disagreed with those views and said that expressing those views was a "dumb game we woke westerners play where we say all the right shibboleths and so everyone likes us".

Bankruptcy of FTX 

In November 2022, Binance CEO Changpeng Zhao revealed on Twitter that his firm intended to sell its holdings of FTT, FTX's token. Binance received $529 million worth of FTT as part of a sale of its equity in FTX in 2021. Zhao published his tweet soon after a report from CoinDesk stating that the bulk of the holdings of Alameda, Bankman-Fried's trading firm, were in FTT. Bloomberg and TechCrunch reported that any sale by Binance would likely have an outsize impact on FTT's price due to the token's low trading volume. The announcement by Zhao of the pending sale and disputes between Zhao and Bankman-Fried on Twitter led to a decline in the price of FTT and other cryptocurrencies. Shortly before, Zhao had criticized Bankman-Fried's lobbying efforts.

On November 8, Zhao announced that Binance had entered into a non-binding agreement to purchase FTX due to a liquidity crisis at FTX. Zhao stated that Binance would complete due diligence soon and that all crypto exchanges should avoid using tokens as collateral. He also wrote that he expected FTT to be "highly volatile in the coming days as things develop". On the day of the announcement, FTT lost 80 percent of its value. On November 9, the Wall Street Journal reported that Binance had decided not to acquire FTX. Binance cited reports of FTX's mishandling of customer funds and pending investigations of FTX as the reasons the firm would not pursue the deal. Amid the crisis, Bankman-Fried was no longer a billionaire, according to the Bloomberg Billionaires Index.  The very next day, Bloomberg reported that the Securities and Exchange Commission and Commodity Futures Trading Commission were investigating FTX and the nature of its connections to Bankman-Fried's other holdings.

On November 11, 2022, FTX, Alameda Research, and more than 130 associated legal entities declared bankruptcy.

Anonymous sources cited by Reuters stated that, earlier in 2022, Bankman-Fried had transferred at least $4 billion from FTX to Alameda Research, without any disclosure to the companies' insiders or the public. The sources said that the money transferred included customer funds, and that it was ostensibly backed by FTT and shares in Robinhood. An anonymous source cited by the Wall Street Journal stated that Bankman-Fried had disclosed that Alameda owed FTX about $10 billion which was secured through customer funds held by FTX when FTX had, at the time, $16 billion in customer assets. According to anonymous sources cited by the Wall Street Journal, the Chief Executive of Alameda Research Caroline Ellison told employees that Bankman-Fried was aware that FTX had lent its customers’ money to Alameda to help it meet its liabilities.

Bankman-Fried resigned as CEO of FTX on November 11 and was replaced by John J. Ray III, known for his role in the bankruptcy and restructuring of Enron. FTX and related entities filed for bankruptcy in Delaware on the same day. One day after FTX declared bankruptcy, on November 12, Bankman-Fried was interviewed by the Royal Bahamas Police Force. On November 17, Ray stated in a sworn declaration submitted in bankruptcy court that according to the firm's records, Alameda Research had lent $1 billion to Bankman-Fried.

Arrest and charges

On December 12, 2022, Bankman-Fried was arrested shortly after 6 p.m. in his apartment complex in the Bahamas by the Royal Bahamas Police Force with the expectation that he would be extradited to the United States to face trial. Earlier that day, the Southern District of New York had charged Bankman-Fried with "wire fraud, wire fraud conspiracy, securities fraud, securities fraud conspiracy and money laundering". Philip Davis, the Prime Minister of the Bahamas, commented on the arrest that "the Bahamas and the United States have a shared interest in holding accountable all individuals associated with FTX who may have betrayed the public trust and broken the law ... while the United States is pursuing criminal charges against SBF individually, the Bahamas will continue its own regulatory and criminal investigations into the collapse of FTX".

Bankman-Fried faces a maximum of 115 years in prison if convicted on all eight counts and sentenced to serve each charge consecutively. Braden Perry, a former senior trial lawyer at the Commodity Futures Trading Commission, stated that a conviction on any of the charges may result in a prison sentence of years or decades.

After being held at Fox Hill Prison in Nassau for 10 days, Bankman-Fried consented to his extradition from the Bahamas to the United States in order to face fraud charges. He is currently free on a $250 million bond, the largest such bond ever set in an American criminal proceeding. Among his conditions is that he reside at his parents' home in California.

The arrest took place the day before Bankman-Fried was scheduled to appear before the U.S. House Committee on Financial Services.

On January 3, 2023, Bankman-Fried pled not guilty to fraud and other charges.

On February 1, 2023, the judge presiding over his case tightened his bail conditions and forbade Bankman-Fried from contacting current or former employees of FTX without attorneys present. The restriction was imposed by Judge Lewis Kaplan, who considered his contact with a potential witness as a "material threat of inappropriate contact with prospective witnesses," and intimated Bankman-Fried might deserve to be jailed pending trial.

An additional 4 criminal charges levied against Bankman-Fried were announced on February 23, 2023, primarily focused on his making of "more than 300 illegal political donations."

Donations

Politics

2020 and earlier 
Bankman-Fried's only campaign finance activity prior to 2019 was a $1,000 contribution in 2010 to Michael Bennet. For the 2020 U.S. elections, he contributed $5.2 million to two super PACs that supported the Joe Biden 2020 presidential campaign. Bankman-Fried was the second-largest individual donor to Biden in the 2020 election cycle, after Michael Bloomberg.

2021–2022 
Contributions were made to members of both U.S. political parties. In 2022, Bankman-Fried provided initial financial support for Protect Our Future PAC. Protect Our Future was launched as a political action committee of the Democratic Party with $10 million in initial funding aiming to support "lawmakers who play the long game on policymaking in areas like pandemic preparedness and planning", according to Politico. Bankman-Fried donated $27 million in total to this PAC.

Donations to Republican Party campaigns in the 2021–22 cycle have been estimated at $262,200, including donations to senators Susan Collins of Maine, Mitt Romney of Utah, Lisa Murkowski of Alaska, and Ben Sasse of Nebraska. Journalist Matthew Kassel says that Bankman-Fried had often donated to politicians who cultivate good Israel–United States relations but concluded "it is unclear if his backing of pro-Israel candidates was coincidental or motivated by any personal interest in Middle East policy."

Bankman-Fried has claimed he also donated large amounts of money to Republicans through dark money channels.

2022 U.S. midterm elections 
Bankman-Fried was the second-largest individual donor to Democratic causes for the 2022 U.S. elections, with total donations of $39.8 million, only behind George Soros, of which $27 million was given to the Protect Our Future PAC. Additional recipients included The Next 50 PAC, Guarding Against Pandemics PAC, and the leadership PAC for Brendan Boyle. Bankman-Fried said in February 2022 that his political contributions were not aimed at influencing his policy goals for the cryptocurrency ecosystem; however, FTX was circulating a list of suggestions to policymakers at the time. He said in an interview that he would prefer the Commodity Futures Trading Commission take a larger role in regulating and guiding the crypto industry. According to The New York Times, the CFTC has a reputation for favoring relatively relaxed regulations for the industry when contrasted with other regulators like the Securities and Exchange Commission.

Bankman-Fried pushed for regulations via the proposed Digital Commodities Consumer Protection Act (DCCPA) by extensively lobbying Congress, which was perceived as being favorable to FTX but harmful to the broader industry, especially its decentralized finance competitors. In May 2022, Bankman-Fried stated that he planned to spend "north of $100 million" in the 2024 presidential election with a "soft ceiling" of $1 billion. In October 2022, he walked back his pledged spending, calling it a "dumb quote on my part".

In the aftermath of the FTX scandal, recipients of Bankman-Fried's and other FTX executives' political campaign contributions have been donating equal amounts to charitable organizations. Elected officials doing so include Senator Kirsten Gillibrand, as well as Representatives Chuy García and Kevin Hern. A spokesperson for former Texas gubernatorial candidate Beto O'Rourke said that his campaign had received a $1 million donation from Bankman-Fried in October 2022, but returned the funds in early November, prior to the election.

Pandemic prevention 
Bankman-Fried and his younger brother, Gabriel, made large contributions toward pandemic prevention initiatives, according to an investigative report by The Washington Post. One such funding mechanism was the Guarding Against Pandemics PAC founded by Gabe. FTX donated $18 million to support the TOGETHER Trial global expansion, announced on the same day that trial investigators received the Trial of the Year Award from the Society for Clinical Trials for their work on COVID-19 treatments.

Personal life 
Bankman-Fried is vegan. As of mid-2021, it was reported that he lived in a five-bedroom penthouse in the Bahamas with approximately ten roommates. After the collapse of FTX, the penthouse was put up for sale for close to $40 million.

According to former employees of FTX and Alameda, Bankman-Fried was romantically involved with co-worker Caroline Ellison, the CEO at Alameda Research.

Bankman-Fried plays League of Legends, and allegedly played the game while on a call attempting to secure an investment from Sequoia Capital. An article by the Financial Times characterized Bankman-Fried's "win ratios" in League of Legends as "average-to-bad".

Recognition
 2021: Named in Forbes 30 Under 30 – North America - Finance

Notes

References

External links 

1992 births
21st-century American businesspeople
American chief executives
American company founders
American computer businesspeople
21st-century American Jews
Campaign finance in the United States
Former billionaires
Jane Street Capital people
Massachusetts Institute of Technology people
Massachusetts Institute of Technology alumni
MIT Department of Physics alumni
People associated with cryptocurrency
People associated with effective altruism
Living people
Prisoners and detainees of the Bahamas
People charged with wire fraud
Wealth in the United States
Prisoners and detainees of the United States federal government